Giovan Snyman (born ) is a South African rugby union player for the  in the Currie Cup. His regular position is scrum-half.

Snyman was named in the  squad for the Super Rugby Unlocked and the 2020–21 Currie Cup Premier Division competitions.

References

South African rugby union players
Living people
2000 births
Rugby union scrum-halves
Pumas (Currie Cup) players
Leopards (rugby union) players